Slide Effect is a presentation tool providing enhanced transitions and effects. Using a standard Presentation Software user interface, people can create slide presentation with movies and images in a simpler way than using a video editing software.

History 
First version of Slide Effect was originally created in April 2008. It was then nominated to the Epsilon Awards 2008 and in April 2009, a Pro edition has been released.

Devsoft is based in Switzerland.

Main Features 
 Support for main images and movies formats.
 Output as movie, flash video, executable or screensaver.
 Professional edition is able to read/write PowerPoint files.

See also
Slideshow
Presentation Software
Video editing software
Screensaver

References

External links 
 Official Slide Effect site
 Company site

Presentation software